Songgotu (1636 – 1703) was a minister during the reign of the Kangxi Emperor of the Qing dynasty. He was an uncle of the emperor's primary spouse, Empress Xiaochengren of the Hešeri clan, who died during childbirth. He was also the son of Sonin, one of the four regents appointed to assist the young Kangxi Emperor during his minority. As Empress Xiaochengren's paternal uncle, he was also therefore, the grand-uncle of Yinreng, who was crown prince throughout most of the Kangxi Emperor's reign. Songgotu did not inherit the noble title First-class Duke or First-class Earl from his father Sonin because his mother was not the primary consort, therefore, he had the lowest status of his brothers. His sixth brother and fifth brother inherited the noble titles First-class Duke and First-class Count. His oldest brother, Gabula, was Empress Xiaochengren's father, and he also had the noble title First-class Duke. 

Songgotu helped the young Kangxi Emperor depose Oboi, a regent during the reign of the young emperor. Gradually, Songgotu gained more power and became one of the most prominent officials under Kangxi. He was involved in a long power struggle with Mingju, another official at Kangxi's court. He also acted as a diplomat and signed the Treaty of Nerchinsk with Russia. 

During Kangxi's expedition against Dzungar khan Galdan, Songgotu advocated for a withdrawal, but was reprimanded by the emperor for suggesting such a strategy. Songgotu was later implicated in the heir-apparent crisis, and he was imprisoned until death. Kangxi rescinded recognition for all of Songgotu's achievements during the latter's life, with the sole exception of the Treaty with Russia.

In fiction
 The Deer and the Cauldron, a wuxia novel by Louis Cha. In the story, Songgotu was an aristocrat who befriended the protagonist Wei Xiaobao.

References

 
 Spence, Jonathan. Emperor of China: Self-Portrait of K'ang-hsi. Jonathan Cape (1974) .

Qing dynasty diplomats
Deliberative Princes and Ministers
1636 births
1703 deaths
Politicians from Shenyang
Qing dynasty politicians from Liaoning
Grand Secretaries of the Qing dynasty
Manchu Plain Yellow Bannermen
Hešeri clan